Le Petit Journal was a conservative daily Parisian newspaper founded by Moïse Polydore Millaud; published from 1863 to 1944. Together with Le Petit Parisien, Le Matin, and Le Journal, it was one of the four major French dailies. In 1890, during the Boulangiste crisis, its circulation first reached one million copies. Five years later, it had a circulation of two million copies, making it the world's largest newspaper.

History

Early years

The first issue of the Journal appeared on 1 February 1863 with a printing of 83,000 copies. Its founder, Millaud, was originally from Bordeaux and had begun as a publisher of financial and legal newsletters. For a few years, he was the owner of La Presse, an early penny paper. The first printing ran to 83,000 copies; a large printing compared to the other serious newspapers. For example, Le Siècle typically had a press run of 50,000 copies.

Within two years the Journal was printing 259,000 copies, making it the largest daily in Paris. By 1870, it had reached 340,000 copies; twice the figure for the other major dailies put together. Much of this progress was made possible by the rotary presses that had been designed by Hippolyte Auguste Marinoni in 1866 and installed at the Journal in 1872.

Despite its apparent successes, the Millaud family found themselves in financial difficulties and, in 1873, sold their interests in the company to a group headed by Émile de Girardin. In 1882, Marinoni took control of the Journal, succeeding Girardin. In 1884, he introduced the Supplément illustré, a weekly Sunday supplement that was the first to feature colour illustrations. This became so popular that, in 1889, Marinoni developed a colour rotary press that could print 20,000 sheets per hour. By 1895, one million copies of the supplement were being produced every week and the Journal had a press run of two million copies, 80% of which went to the provinces, making it France's predominant newspaper.

Later years and decline 
By 1900, the paper's growth was slowing considerably. Many of its readers had gone over to Le Petit Parisien because that paper had avoided taking sides in the Dreyfus Affair, whereas , the Journal's editor, was staunchly Anti-Dreyfus. Soon after, Le Petit Parisien became France's best-selling newspaper. By 1914, the Journal's printing run had decreased to 850,000. By 1919, it had fallen to 400,000.

In 1936, the Journal became the official organ of the French Social Party, with the motto, "Travail, Famille, Patrie", which was borrowed from the "Croix-de-Feu" league and later became the motto of the Vichy régime. Despite receiving support from many notable figures, including the press magnate Raymond Patenôtre, its decline continued and, by 1937, the typical press run was only 150,000.

In the Second World War, its headquarters was moved to Clermont-Ferrand in 1940. It received a monthly grant from the government, and François de La Rocque became chairman of its board of directors, but the paper could not be saved, and the final issue was published in August 1944.

Description and contents 

Part of the Journal's attraction was its low price. Because in the beginning it officially (if not actually) did not cover politics, it avoided paying the 10 centimes newspaper tax, and therefore could be sold for only 5 centimes, as opposed to 15 centimes for the typical daily. It came in a convenient format of 43×30 cm (17×12 ins.), did not require a subscription and, in addition to the news, offered feature stories, serials (including the popular detective stories of Émile Gaboriau), horoscopes and opinion pieces. Also, it was distributed in the evening, so it could be hawked to workers leaving their shops and factories.

One of the Journal's major innovations, that made a substantial contribution to its popularity, was the publishing of detailed minutes from sensational trials, beginning with the Troppmann Affair in 1869. The exploitation of this affair enabled the Journal to almost double its readership. It was also one of the earliest instances of a publication's journalistic ethics being called to serious account.

National Library of France – Gallica 
All copies of Le Petit Journal are stored at the National Library France – Gallica.  They can be freely accessed online at Gallica, Online Archive, Le Petit Journal Index

See also

 History of French journalism
 Pierre Giffard

References

Further reading
 William Howard Schneider, An Empire for the Masses: The French Popular Image of Africa 1870–1900 (Greenwood, 1982) . An examination of the way French newspapers, and Le Petit Journal in particular, shaped representations of imperialism in the French public mind.

External links 

 Every issue of Le Petit Journal from 1863 to 1940, viewable online in Gallica, the digital library of the BnF. 
 Issues of Le Petit Journal illustré from 1884 to 1920, viewable online in Gallica, the digital library of the BnF. 
 Histoire de La Petit Journal @ Carrefour.

1863 establishments in France
1944 disestablishments in France
Defunct newspapers published in France
French penny papers
Newspapers published in Paris
Publications established in 1863
Publications disestablished in 1944
Newspapers of the Vichy regime
Daily newspapers published in France